Daniela Pulido Saldaña (born 29 April 2000), known as Daniela Pulido, is a Mexican professional football defender who played for Guadalajara (Chivas) of the Liga MX Femenil, the first professional women's soccer league in Mexico. In 2017, she helped Chivas win the first professional women's soccer championship in the country at the age of 17 in front of a record-breaking 32,466 spectators.

Early life
Pulido began playing football at the age of five. As a young girl, she endured abusive bullying behavior from other children and parents because she was a girl player, but kept training and playing.

Playing career

Guadalajara, 2017– 
Pulido began playing for Guadalajara during the inaugural season of Liga MX Femenil. In July 2017, she scored two goals to become the first player to record a brace at the Tapatío Women's Classic and lead the team to win.

Honours

Club
Guadalajara
Liga MX Femenil: Apertura 2017

References

External links
 
 Daniela Pulido at C.D. Guadalajara Femenil 

2000 births
Living people
Mexican women's footballers
Footballers from Guadalajara, Jalisco
Liga MX Femenil players
C.D. Guadalajara (women) footballers
Women's association football defenders
21st-century Mexican women
Mexican footballers